Therapia Lane tram stop is a stop on the Tramlink service in Croydon, close to the Purley Way commercial area. The stop is in the London Borough of Sutton close to the boundary with Croydon. It is one of two Tramlink stops within Sutton borough, the other being Beddington Lane.

Just to the west of the stop is Therapia Lane Depot Staff Halt, a two platform stop used only by staff getting to or from Therapia Lane depot, and not permitted for public use. However, since 21 March 2020, the stop has been out of use due to its narrow, short platforms preventing social distancing during the COVID-19 pandemic. The staff halt's future is uncertain given it is less than 80m from the public stop.

Connections
London Buses routes 455 and 463 serve the tram stop.

References

Tramlink stops in the London Borough of Sutton
Railway stations in Great Britain opened in 2000